Muumuu House is an independent, small press publishing company based in Manhattan, New York that was founded by writer Tao Lin in 2008. Muumuu House publishes poetry, fiction, and nonfiction in print and online.

Muumuu House has published print books by writers Zac Smith, Megan Boyle, Brandon Scott Gorrell, and Ellen Kennedy.

Online publications have included works by Ben Lerner, Sheila Heti, Michael W. Clune, Stacey Levine, Matthew Rohrer, Michael Earl Craig, Sam Pink, Deb Olin Unferth, Rebecca Curtis, Noah Cicero, Mallory Whitten, Jordan Castro, Mira Gonzalez, Zachary German, Andrew Weatherhead, Nicolette Polek, Anna Dorn, Elizabeth Ellen, James Purdy, Big Bruiser Dope Boy, Precious Okoyomon, Rachel Glaser, Sarah Gerard, Aoko Matsuda, Clancy Martin, and Kristen Iskandrian.

Publications
 Smith, Zac. 2022. Everything Is Totally Fine. Muumuu House. 
 Boyle, Megan. 2011. selected unpublished blog posts of a Mexican panda express employee. Muumuu House. 
 Gorrell, Brandon Scott. 2009. during my nervous breakdown i want to have a biographer present. Muumuu House. 
 Kennedy, Ellen. 2009. sometimes my heart pushes my ribs. Muumuu House.

References

Links
Interview with Zac Smith and Tao Lin on KCRW's Bookworm

2008 establishments in New York City
Book publishing companies based in New York (state)
Companies based in Manhattan
Publishing companies established in 2008
Small press publishing companies
Tao Lin